Pietro Strambone, O.P. (died 1503) was a Roman Catholic prelate who served as Bishop of Nocera de' Pagani (1479–1503).

He was appointed a priest in the Order of Preachers.
On 16 June 1479, he was appointed during the papacy of Pope Paul II as Bishop of Nocera de' Pagani.
He served as Bishop of Nocera de' Pagani until his death in 1503.

References

External links and additional sources
 (for Chronology of Bishops) 
 (for Chronology of Bishops) 

15th-century Italian Roman Catholic bishops
16th-century Italian Roman Catholic bishops
Bishops appointed by Pope Paul II
1503 deaths
Dominican bishops